Wessington Springs is a city in central Jerauld County, South Dakota, United States. The population was 956 at the 2010 census. It is the county seat of Jerauld County.

History
The Wessington Springs townsite was founded in 1880 and platted in 1882, early in the era of agricultural settlement in the region.  The town's boom era began in 1903, when a branch line of the Milwaukee Road railroad was constructed into the town from the east.

The town was the home of Wessington Springs College, an institution of higher learning that existed from 1887 until 1968. There is a baseball field in town that hosts an amateur baseball team named the Wessington Springs Owls.

2014 tornado

On June 18, 2014 the town of Wessington Springs was hit by a tornado. At approximately 7:45 PM the tornado tore through the heart of Wessington Springs and 50+ homes were destroyed, and 77 people were left homeless. Many other buildings and properties were damaged significantly. No fatalities were reported but several injuries were sustained. The town's emergency sirens gave residents significant advance notice to the threat, allowing residents to flee to the town's fallout shelter avoiding injury and death. The town was on lockdown for several hours to prevent further injuries and blockages.

Geography
Wessington Springs is located at  (44.081842, -98.570244).

Wessington Springs has been assigned the ZIP code 57382 and the FIPS place code 70220.

Climate

Demographics

2010 census
As of the census of 2010, there were 956 people, 465 households, and 266 families residing in the city. The racial makeup of the city was 99.0% White, 0.3% Native American, 0.3% Asian, 0.2% from other races, and 0.2% from two or more races. Hispanic or Latino of any race were 0.6% of the population.

There were 465 households, of which 16.3% had children under the age of 18 living with them, 47.3% were married couples living together, 6.9% had a female householder with no husband present, 3.0% had a male householder with no wife present, and 42.8% were non-families. 38.1% of all households were made up of individuals, and 26.2% had someone living alone who was 65 years of age or older. The average household size was 1.97 and the average family size was 2.57.

The median age in the city was 57 years. 16.1% of residents were under the age of 18; 4.4% were between the ages of 18 and 24; 14.7% were from 25 to 44; 27.2% were from 45 to 64; and 37.6% were 65 years of age or older. The gender makeup of the city was 43.4% male and 56.6% female.

2000 census
As of the census of 2000, there were 1,011 people, 505 households, and 285 families residing in the city. The population density was 572.9 people per square mile (221.8/km2). There were 580 housing units at an average density of 328.6 per square mile (127.2/km2). The racial makeup of the city was 99.01% White, 0.40% Native American, 0.20% Asian, and 0.40% from two or more races. Hispanic or Latino of any race were 0.30% of the population.

There were 505 households, out of which 16.4% had children under the age of 18 living with them, 48.3% were married couples living together, 5.3% had a female householder with no husband present, and 43.4% were non-families. 39.6% of all households were made up of individuals, and 26.7% had someone living alone who was 65 years of age or older. The average household size was 1.92 and the average family size was 2.50.

In the city, the population was spread out, with 15.4% under the age of 18, 5.1% from 18 to 24, 15.6% from 25 to 44, 23.3% from 45 to 64, and 40.5% who were 65 years of age or older. The median age was 55 years. For every 100 females, there were 82.2 males. For every 100 females age 18 and over, there were 79.2 males.

The median income for a household in the city was $31,736, and the median income for a family was $40,962. Males had a median income of $28,929 versus $18,333 for females. The per capita income for the city was $23,108. About 3.4% of families and 7.2% of the population were below the poverty line, including 11.0% of those under age 18 and 8.1% of those age 65 or over.

Media
The area is served by the True Dakotan weekly newspaper.

Notable people
 Kyle Evans, country and western singer/songwriter
 Emma Louise Lowe - Musician, educator, former First Lady of American Samoa and former First Lady of Guam
 Robert Vessey, seventh Governor of South Dakota

See also
 List of cities in South Dakota
 Perkins & McWayne

References

External links

 

Cities in Jerauld County, South Dakota
Cities in South Dakota
County seats in South Dakota